The Sol Plaatje University, which had provisionally been referred to as the University of the Northern Cape, opened in Kimberley, South Africa, in 2014, accommodating a modest initial intake of 135 students. The student complement is expected to increase gradually towards a target of 7 500 students by 2024. Launched in a ceremony in Kimberley on 19 September 2013,  it had been formally established as a public university in terms of Section 20 of the Higher Education Act of 1997, by way of Government Notice 630, dated 22 August 2013. Minister of Higher Education and Training, Blade Nzimande, observed at the launch that this “is the first new university (in South Africa) to be launched since 1994 and as such is a powerful symbol of the country’s democracy, inclusiveness, and growth. It represents a new order of African intellect, with a firm focus on innovation and excellence."  Previously announcing the name for the university, on 25 July 2013, President Jacob Zuma mentioned the development of academic niche areas that did not exist elsewhere, or were under-represented, in South Africa. "Given the rich heritage of Kimberley and the Northern Cape in general," Zuma said, "it is envisaged that Sol Plaatje will specialise in heritage studies, including interconnected academic fields such as museum management, archaeology, indigenous languages, and restoration architecture."
Prof Andrew Crouch took over the helm on 1 April 2020 after the term of founding Vice-Chancellor, Prof Yunus Ballim came to a close.

History

The idea of establishing a university in the Northern Cape gained political endorsement in 2012, most notably in President Jacob Zuma’s announcement of 5 July 2012 that the seat and main campus for the university would be the inner city of Kimberley. It was believed that there was “potential to inject new life and purpose into this historic mining city”. The idea achieved legal substance when a record of intention was signed by officials in Kimberley on 19 March 2013. Party to the agreement were national Higher Education Minister Blade Nzimande, the Northern Cape Province's acting premier Grizelda Cjiekella, and the mayor of the Sol Plaatje Municipality, Agnes Ntlhangula.

The signing of the record of intention was a preparatory step towards a gazetted notice which would bring the institution into being as a legal entity. The university would be one of the first two to be established in post-apartheid South Africa – the other to be situated in Mpumalanga.

The university opened in 2014.

The Department of Higher Education and Training (DHET) appointed the University of the Witwatersrand to set up a DHET New Universities Project Management Team to plan for the new university in Kimberley.

Nominations were invited in December 2012 for members of an Interim Council for the new university.

The Interim Council announced by President Jacob Zuma on 25 July 2013 comprises: Ms Jennifer Glennie, as Chairperson, and, as members: Mr Abel Madonsela, Mr Maruping Lekwene, Dr Yvonne Muthien, and Prof Vishnu Padayachee.

Feasibility
A study into the feasibility of both the infrastructure and operations for the new university had been submitted to national Treasury in September 2012. Treasury endorsed the plan (including that for a university in Mpumalanga), allocating R2 billion for the period 2013 to 2016.

Campus

It is anticipated that the Sol Plaatje University would occupy a combination of existing and purpose-built structures in the inner city of Kimberley, specifically the present Civic Centre including parts of the Oppenheimer Gardens and surrounding buildings. These include the former Cape Provincial Administration building which has been used by the National Institute for Higher Education. Provincial MEC Pauline Williams (Sport, Arts and Culture) has referred to the McGregor Museum in Kimberley becoming "a serious role-player" with its collections and research disciplines being key resources and "the nucleus of a future faculty."

In May 2013 the Department of Higher Education and Training New Universities Project Management Team (Northern Cape) invited expressions of interest from architects to participate in a two-stage architectural ideas competition for addressing the need for new buildings and “to encourage innovative ideas, and best practice concepts, as well as to identify talented designers to participate in the design of the university precincts and buildings.”

Curriculum
Programmes that have been reported in the media would be in disciplines such as information technology and computer sciences, engineering, and agriculture; studies in management focusing on business and hospitality management; nursing as a focus of health sciences; with specializations in teacher education, indigenous languages, heritage studies, and art also being planned.

It was also suggested that the university was “expected to offer postgraduate studies in astronomy, as well as in applied sciences such as renewable energy, low carbon energy, hydrology, water resource management, and climate variability.”

The DHET New Universities Project Management Team website indicates the intention that the new university should have unique programmes and research priorities enabling it to attract students, academics and researchers nationally and internationally. This implies academic missions that would develop towards specialist niche areas not available elsewhere in South Africa, attracting and retaining skilled staff, while inspiring a vibrant student population.

In creating a strong academic hub, the individuality of the province would be drawn upon to develop a unique academic focus.

It is envisaged that the university in the Northern Cape would be a comprehensive, multi-campus University with the seat and main campus in Kimberley. The qualification type would focus on “Higher Certificate, Advanced Certificate and Diploma level as vocational and technology-focused programmes with a phased approach towards formative and professional bachelor's degrees in the study fields of Engineering and Management Sciences.”

Specifically, the following programmes are considered:

Available from 2014

 Computer and Information Science/Engineering: Diploma in Information Technology (Applications Development)
 Business, Economics and Management Sciences: National Diploma: Retail Business Management 
 Education: B Ed (Further Education and Training - Maths, Technology & Science)

From 2015

 Health Professions and Related Clinical Sciences: Diploma in Nursing and Higher Certificate in Emergency Medical Care
 Social Sciences: Museology/Museum Studies and Heritage Studies (New qualification)
 Life Sciences & Physical Sciences BSc (Life and Physical Sciences)

From 2016

 Business, Economics and Management Sciences: National Diploma Tourism Management
 Visual and performing arts: National Diploma in Fine Arts
 Engineering: BSc Software engineering
 Agriculture: National Diploma in Agriculture
 Diploma in Law or Bachelor Law

References

External links
 

 
Universities in the Northern Cape
Kimberley, Northern Cape